Frans Bezuidenhout (born 5 January 1953) is a South African cricketer. He played in one List A and six first-class matches for Border from 1974/75 to 1979/80.

See also
 List of Border representative cricketers

References

External links
 

1953 births
Living people
South African cricketers
Border cricketers
Cricketers from East London, Eastern Cape